Brat Tor, also known as Brai Tor and Widgery Tor, is a dramatic granite tor on the western flank of Dartmoor, England. It is best known for Widgery Cross, the tallest Dartmoor cross, which stands on its summit. It is, however, not as grand as other neighbouring tors, such as the imposing Great Links Tor and Hare Tor. It stands at 454 metres above sea level.

References

Geography of Devon
Tors of Dartmoor
Dartmoor